This is a discography for American singer-songwriter Kris Kristofferson.

Studio albums

1970s

1980s and 1990s

2000s and 2010s

Live albums

Collaboration albums

Compilation albums

Singles

1960s—1970s

1980s—2000s

Singles with Rita Coolidge

Other appearances

Studio appearances

Guest appearances

Music videos

Notes

A ^Kristofferson was re-released in 1971 as Me and Bobby McGee

References

External links
 

Country music discographies
Discographies of American artists